The Nigu River is a  tributary of the Etivluk River in the U.S. state of Alaska. The Nigu flows through some of the most remote locations in northern Alaska for its entire length.

See also
List of rivers of Alaska

References

Rivers of North Slope Borough, Alaska
Rivers of Northwest Arctic Borough, Alaska
Rivers of Alaska